Angels & Demons is a 2000 bestselling mystery-thriller novel written by American author Dan Brown and published by Pocket Books and then by Corgi Books. The novel introduces the character Robert Langdon, who recurs as the protagonist of Brown's subsequent novels. Angels & Demons shares many stylistic literary elements with its sequels, such as conspiracies of secret societies, a single-day time frame, and the Catholic Church. Ancient history, architecture, and symbology are also heavily referenced throughout the book. A film adaptation was released on May 15, 2009.

Background
The book contains several ambigrams created by real-life typographer John Langdon. Besides the "Angels & Demons" and "Illuminati" designs, the title of the book is also presented as an ambigram on the hardcover book jacket, and on the inside cover of the paperback versions.  The book also contains ambigrams of the words Earth, Air, Fire, and  Water, which has served to bring the art of ambigrams to public attention by virtue of the popularity of the book.  The "Illuminati Diamond" mentioned in the book is an ambigram of the four elements that are arranged in the shape of a diamond.

Plot
Leonardo Vetra, one of CERN's top physicists who have discovered how to create antimatter, is murdered, his chest branded with an ambigram of the word "Illuminati", an ancient anti-religious organization thought extinct. CERN director Maximilian Kohler calls Vetra's adopted daughter, Vittoria, and Robert Langdon, an expert on symbology and religious history, for help. After determining the ambigram is authentic, they discover a canister of antimatter from Leonardo's lab is stolen, which will explode in 24 hours when the canister's battery runs out. Langdon and Vittoria go to Vatican City, where four Preferiti, the Cardinals who are candidates for Pope, are kidnapped by the Hassassin, who plans to blow up the Vatican with the antimatter canister and kill the four cardinals under the orders of "Janus", the leader of the Illuminati.

Believing that the four cardinals will be ritually murdered on the four altars of the "Path of Illumination", Langdon and Vittoria follow a series of clues left in various churches in and around Rome. After finding the first two men dead (one suffocated by earth and another whose lungs were punctured), they confront the assassin in the act of murdering the third. However, they fail to save the third cardinal and, in as that location catches fire, the assassin kidnaps Vittoria. Langdon also fails to save the last cardinal, who is drowned in the Fontana dei Quattro Fiumi, and confronts the assassin in the Castel Sant' Angelo, the Church of Illumination. Langdon frees Vittoria and together they send the assassin falling several hundred feet to his death. 

Meanwhile, Kohler arrives as the good Samaritarian to confront Camerlengo Carlo Ventresca, the late Pope's closest aide. Fearing Kohler is Janus, the two hurry back to St. Peter's Basilica to prevent him from murdering Ventresca. However, the Swiss Guards burst into the room and open fire on Kohler when Ventresca screams. Just before he dies, Kohler gives Langdon a mini video camera which records his confrontation with Ventresca. 

With Langdon in pursuit, Ventresca ventures into the catacombs and finds the canister sitting atop the tomb of Saint Peter. Ventresca takes the canister to a safe height in a helicopter and parachutes safely onto the roof of St. Peter's just as the canister explodes in the sky. Due to the "miracle", the Cardinals debate whether to elect Ventresca as the new Pope. Meanwhile, Langdon learns from the video that Ventresca himself is Janus, working to sabotage the Vatican. He confesses that he poisoned the Pope upon the Pope's revelation that he had fathered a child, and because of his opposition with Leonardo's attempt to bridge science and God. Under the guise of Janus, he recruited the assassin to kill Vetra, steal the antimatter and kidnap and murder the Preferiti.

Cardinal Saverio Mortati, Dean of the College of Cardinals, reveals that Ventresca is, in fact, the late Pope's biological son, conceived with a nun through artificial insemination. Overcome with guilt, Ventresca soaks himself in oil and sets himself on fire before a crowd of onlookers in St. Peter's Square. Mortati is unanimously elected Pope by the Cardinals, and Langdon and Vittoria reunite at Hotel Bernini.

Characters
 Robert Langdon: A professor of symbology at Harvard University and the protagonist of the novel. He is flown to CERN to help investigate the murder of Leonardo Vetra. He is described as wearing a Harris Tweed jacket, a turtleneck sweater, and a pair of chino pants. His name is a tribute to John Langdon.
 Leonardo Vetra: A scientist working at CERN and a priest. He is researching on antimatter when he is murdered by the assassin. He is also the adoptive father of Vittoria.
 Vittoria Vetra: The adopted daughter of Vetra. She, like her father, works with CERN. She is a strict vegetarian. Her research focuses on biology and physics. The reader learns early in the novel that Vittoria worked with her father in their research of antimatter.
 Camerlengo Carlo Ventresca: The Camerlengo (papal chamberlain) during the conclave. He murdered the pope, who is later revealed to have been his biological father. His code name for dealing with the assassin is "Janus," taken from the two-faced Roman god of beginnings and ends.
 Cardinal Saverio Mortati: The most senior cardinal in the conclave, and the current Dean of the College of Cardinals. He was the Devil's Advocate for the late pope.
 Commander Ernesto Olivetti: The commandant of the Swiss Guard. He is initially skeptical about the claims of Langdon and Vittoria until he talks with the assassin. He, along with other Swiss Guards, searches desperately for the missing antimatter hidden somewhere in the Vatican. He is killed by the assassin at the church of Santa Maria della Vittoria.
 Captain Elias Rocher: The second-in-command after Commander Olivetti. He is contacted by Maximilian Kohler about his knowledge on the real cause of the events. He is killed by Lt. Chartrand, who was under the impression that Rocher was an Illuminatus.
 Hassassin: The killer hired by Janus to fulfill his plans. He is of Middle Eastern origin and displays his sadistic lust for women throughout the novel. He murders Leonardo Vetra, the Preferiti, and Commander Olivetti. He dies after being pushed from a balcony by Langdon at Castel Sant'Angelo and breaking his back on a pile of cannonballs below.
 Maximilian Kohler: The director of CERN. He is feared at CERN despite his paralysis. His wheelchair contains electronic gadgets such as a computer, telephone, pager, video camera, and a gun. He contacts Langdon to help him find the killer of his friend, Leonardo Vetra. He blames the Church for his disability, due to his highly religious parents denying him medical care as a child and becomes a scientist as a way to rebel.
 Gunther Glick and Chinita Macri: A reporter and his photojournalist for the BBC. They are contacted by the assassin regarding the events happening in the Vatican. Glick has a notorious reputation as a sensationalist and conspiracy theorist journalist. Macri, meanwhile, is a veteran camerawoman and a foil to Glick. They have the first hand account on the events in the novel, from the beginning of the conclave to the election of Mortati as pope.
 Lieutenant Chartrand: A young Swiss Guard. He, together with Commander Olivetti and Capt. Rocher, searches desperately for the antimatter hidden somewhere in the Vatican. He shoots and kills Captain Rocher after he is mistaken as an Illuminatus. Near the end of the novel, he is sent by the new pope to give the Illuminati Diamond to Langdon on indefinite loan.
 Cardinal Ebner: One of the four preferiti from Frankfurt, Germany. He is killed by smothering, via dirt and soil forced into his mouth.
 Cardinal Lamassé: One of the four preferiti from Paris, France. He is killed by punctures to his lungs from which he bled to death.
 Cardinal Guidera: One of the four preferiti from Barcelona, Spain. He is burned alive.
 Cardinal Baggia: One of the four preferiti from Milan, Italy; the favorite to succeed as the new pope. He is drowned by the assassin.

Inaccuracies
The book's first edition contained numerous inaccuracies of location of places in Rome, as well as incorrect uses of Italian language. Some of the language issues were corrected in the following editions.

Aside from the explicit introduction, the book depicts various fictional experts explaining matters in science, technology, and history in which critics have pointed out inaccuracies. An example of this is the antimatter discussions, wherein the book suggests that antimatter can be produced in useful and practical quantities and will be a limitless source of power. CERN published an FAQ page about Angels & Demons on their website stating that antimatter cannot be used as an energy source because creating it takes more energy than it produces.

Angels & Demons Decoded, a documentary on the American cable television network, The History Channel, premiered on May 10, 2009, shortly before the release of the novel's film adaptation. The documentary explores the various bases of the novel's story, as well as its inaccuracies. A CERN official, for example, points out that over the last 20 years, approximately 10 billionths of a gram of antimatter has been produced at the facility, whose explosive yield is equivalent to that of a firecracker, far less than is needed for it to be the threat depicted in the novel.

According to The Boston Globe language columnist Ben Zimmer, the Devil's Advocate, which is indicated in the novel to have a role in the selection of the pope, has nothing to do with the papal conclave, and was instead employed to present arguments against the proposed canonization of a person as a saint. Zimmer adds that the Devil's Advocate was abolished by Pope John Paul II in 1983, 17 years before the novel was published.

See also

 Draper–White thesis
 Particle accelerators in popular culture
 Gian Lorenzo Bernini 
 The Da Vinci Code

References

Sources
 Burstein, Dan (ed). Secrets of Angels & Demons: The unauthorized guide to the bestselling novel, 2004, CDS Books.  , Collection of many essays by world-class historians and other experts, discussing the fact & fiction of the novel
 Angels and Demons Draws Tourists to Rome, January 20, 2005, NPR
 CERN's own page about fact and fiction in the novel
 Angels and Demons Movie News Site
 Path of Illumination (with photos of the places of Angels & Demons)
 Dan Brown's own page
 Book 'Antimatter, The Ultimate Mirror'

External links

 Official website
 Official UK website
 CERN Angels-and-Demons website

 
2000 American novels
American Christian novels
American novels adapted into films
American thriller novels
American crime novels
Novels about elections
Novels by Dan Brown
Novels set in Rome
Novels set in Vatican City
Techno-thriller novels
Novels about the Illuminati
Novels set in one day